Hurlbut Glacier, is a glacier in northwestern Greenland. Administratively it belongs to the Avannaata municipality.

This glacier was named by Robert Peary after Geoge Hurlbut (1830 – 1908), secretary and librarian of the  American Geographical Society.

Geography 

The Hurlbut Glacier is an ice cap located between Olrik Fjord and Inglefield Fjord with an outlet that flows roughly from south to north. The outlet has its terminus in the southern shore of the mid Inglefield Fjord.

See also
List of glaciers in Greenland
Inglefield Fjord

References

External links
Identifying Spatial Variability in Greenland's Outlet Glacier Response to Ocean Heat
Recent ice mass loss in northwestern Greenland
 Glaciers of Greenland